

Teams and Drivers

4WD

2WD

FIA Group N

Open 2WD

Historic

Rally Challenge

4WD

2WD

Classic 4WD

Teams Entries

Category 1–4

Category 5

Results

Summary

Overall

FIA Group N

Open 2WD

Historics

Rally Challenge (4WD)

Rally Challenge (2WD)

Rally Challenge (Classic 4WD)

Points

Points System 

Championship: Awarded for Top 20 Overall / Class
Day Points: Awarded for Top 5 overall for each day. (Otago / Whangerai)
Power Stage: Awarded for Top 5 fastest on the Power Stage (Overall & Class)

Overall

Drivers

Co-Driver

4WD

Drivers

Co-Driver

FIA 2WD

Drivers

Co-Driver

Open 2WD

Drivers

Co-Driver

Historics

Drivers

Co-Driver

Rally Challenge 4WD

Drivers

Co-Driver

Rally Challenge 2WD

Drivers

Co-Driver

Rally Challenge Classic 4WD

Drivers

Co-Driver

FIA Junior

Rookie

Gold Card

Manufacturers

Teams

Category 1-4

Category 5

References

New Zealand
Rally Championship